Eghegnamor monastery is a well-preserved medieval Armenian monastery in the middle of Çengilli village (formerly Eghegnamor) village near Kağızman city of modern Turkey. Its great bulk and solidity still dominating the small, crudely built, flat-roofed, houses of the village.  .

Word formation
Eghegnamor is a historical name of the settlement laying around the monastery. Eghegnamor in Armenian for reedy place. Çengilli is the current name of the village. It is derived from its 19th-century name, Chanli, which means "village of the bell-tower". The church is also known as Eghegnamor in Armenian literature. In another sources this monastery called as

History
Eghegnamor (Çengelli) lay in a district of Armenia known as Gabeghyank', which included the town of Kaghzvan (modern Kağızman), and was a part of a larger Armenian province known as Ayrarat. This district was initially a Mamikonian possession, but in the 9th century it became part of the territory of the Bagratids of Ani. When Kars split away from Ani, Gabeghyank' became part of the Kingdom of Kars. By the end of the 19th century the majority of the village's population still was Armenian. They were adherents to the Armenian Church  and called the church St. Astvacacin (Holy Mother of God). This Armenian population was deported to Armenia in 1920 when this district became part of Turkey after the First World War. The village's present inhabitants, like most of the villages in this district, are Kurds - probably recent immigrants from either Erzurum or Doğubayazit. They use the church as a communal barn.

References

Armenian churches in Turkey
Christian monasteries established in the 11th century
Armenian buildings in Turkey